LitFire Publishing is an Atlanta-based provider of a wide range of book self-publishing services, including design, editorial, marketing, etc. Founded in 2008, it started as a publisher of eBooks.

Overview 
LitFire Publishing initially started as a publisher of digital books. They published over a hundred titles before they expanded their services in 2014, wherein they started offering writers the option to self-publish their books. They now help indie authors to self-publish books in physical form (paperback and hardcover) and in digital form (eBook).

Book publishing and marketing services 
LitFire offers a print-on-demand service for authors who want printed copies of their books. For digital publishing, authors are offered services like eBook publishing, eBook conversion, and eBook distribution.

They sell publishing services for books from various categories like thriller/horror, science fiction/fantasy, religious/inspiration, crime mystery, children's books, historical, poetry, business/personal finance, and self-help/how-to. Other book genres that LitFire accepts are autobiography, biography, juvenile fiction, translated work, and western.

Sponsor a Youth Program 
As part of the Sponsor of a Youth Program, LitFire recently gives young authors the opportunity to have their stories signed by a legitimate publisher. Among the many entries, LitFire gave the spot to Barky the Mouse, inspired by 6-year-old kindergartener Carson Stanley. The book which tells the story of a mouse and a cheese-stealing monster—and a more profound theme about forgiveness—started off as an e-book and was later sponsored by LitFire Publishing through a book signing event, where copies of the book were donated to the whole class.

Concerns 
Writer Beware, a publishing industry watchdog group sponsored by the Science Fiction and Fantasy Writers of America, compares LitFire's sales tactics ("cold call solicitations, hard-sell tactics...expensive publishing packages with silly names, absurdly overpriced 'marketing' services") to the methods employed by the much-criticized Author Solutions, and has said that "at least four of LitFire's 'consultants'...are or were employees of Author Solutions imprints." Writer Beware also states that there is no trace of the "over a hundred titles" claimed in Litfire's description.

References 

Book publishing companies of the United States
Publishing companies established in 2008